The Directorate-General for Informatics (DG DIGIT) is a Directorate-General of the European Commission.

The mission of the DG Informatics is to define the IT strategy of the Commission and to provide a modern and high-performance information technology and telecommunications infrastructure.

The current Director-General is Veronica Gaffey.

See also
 European Commissioner for Budget and Administration
 Trans European Services for Telematics between Administrations (TESTA)
 European Network and Information Security Agency
 EUDRANET

External links
Directorate-General for Informatics
ISA

Informatics
European Union organisations based in Luxembourg
Information technology organizations based in Europe